The 1997 tournament of the Primera División de Chile was based in the typical Apertura-Clausura scheme used in many football leagues in Latin-America, similar to the Argentinian First Division. For the first time, this format, with two champions, was used. This tournament format was dropped for the next season (1998), but came back, from 2002 to 2017.

Both champions qualified for the Copa Libertadores, while the two teams with fewest points overall relegated. The season started on 16 February 1997 and ended on 21 December 1997.

Overall table

Torneo de Apertura

Table

Championship play-off

Topscorers

Torneo de Clausura

Table

Topscorers

See also
1997 in Chilean football

Notes

References
RSSSF Page

 
Primera División de Chile seasons
Chile
1997 in Chilean football